William Henry "Yale" Murphy (October 11, 1869 – February 14, 1906) was an American baseball player and coach of American football and baseball.  He played as a shortstop in Major League Baseball for the New York Giants.  Murphy served as the head baseball coach at Stanford University (1900–1901), Columbia University (1902), and the United States Naval Academy (1905), compiling a career college baseball record of 24–27–1.  He was also the head football coach at Fordham University in 1902, tallying a mark of 2–4–1.

Biography
Murphy was born in Southborough, Massachusetts. He attended Yale University, which is how he got his nickname, and played for the National League's New York Giants in 1894, 1895, and 1897. Also called "Tot" or "Midget", Murphy was small even for his era. He and Dickey Pearce are the two shortest players ever to have a career in Major League Baseball. In 1894, there was a book written about him that was entitled Yale Murphy, the Great Short-Stop, or, The Little Midget of the Giants.

Murphy started his professional baseball career in 1894. That season, he was a backup shortstop and outfielder, playing in a career-high 75 games, batting .272, and stealing 28 bases. In 1895, he played mostly in the outfield. He hit just .201 and did not play for the Giants in 1896. He returned for a few games in 1897 and then played one season (1900) in the New York State League.

Murphy batted .240 in 131 career games. After his baseball days were over, he became a physician.

Murphy died of pulmonary tuberculosis on February 14, 1906, after a period of poor health at his home in Southville, Massachusetts.  He was the brother of Mike Murphy, athletic trainer and coach.

Head coaching record

Football

Basketball

References

External links
 
 

1869 births
1906 deaths
19th-century baseball players
20th-century deaths from tuberculosis
Baseball players from Massachusetts
Basketball coaches from Massachusetts
Binghamton Crickets (1880s) players
Columbia Lions baseball coaches
Fordham Rams football coaches
Major League Baseball shortstops
Navy Midshipmen baseball coaches
New York Giants (NL) players
Stanford Cardinal baseball coaches
Yale Bulldogs baseball coaches
Yale Bulldogs baseball players
Yale Bulldogs men's basketball coaches
Tuberculosis deaths in Massachusetts